Toechima dasyrrhache, also known as blunt-leaved steelwood, is a species of plant in the lychee family that is endemic to Australia.

Description
The species grows as a small tree. The pinnate leaves are 8–20 cm long, with oval leaflets which are up to 2–7 cm long and 1–3 cm wide. The tiny white flowers occur in inflorescences 1–7 cm long. The red to orange fruits, 10–20 mm across, contain black seeds with yellow arils.

Distribution and habitat
The species occurs in south-eastern Queensland and north-eastern New South Wales in lowland, subtropical rainforest.

References

Links

dasyrrhache
Flora of Queensland
Flora of New South Wales
Sapindales of Australia
Taxa named by Ludwig Adolph Timotheus Radlkofer
Plants described in 1907